The municipality of Au in der Hallertau is located in the north of the district of Freising and in the southern part of the Hallertau, in Bavaria, Germany. Au is famous for its important role in hop planting and hop distribution.

References

Freising (district)